Bagh-e Malek (also Romanized as Bāgh-e Malek, Bagh-i-Malik, and Bagh Malek) is a city and capital of Bagh-e Malek County, Khuzestan Province, Iran.  At the 2016 census, its population was 114,343, in 26,463 families.

References

Populated places in Bagh-e Malek County
Cities in Khuzestan Province